Madame Nadine Wulffius (1899–1992) was a ballet dancer and choreographer and the founder of her own Ballet School in Maddington, Western Australia.

Life in Latvia under the Czars

Wulffius (née Nadezhda Krivko) was born in Russian ruled Latvia in September 1899 during the reign of the last Romanov Czar Nicholas II. She was the daughter of Fyodor Krivko and Countess Kladiya Alekseyeva-Yaroslavskeya. She recalls in a 1986 Interview with Margita Chudziak the events of her early life.

The Imperial Ballet School

Wulffius as a child saw "Sleeping Beauty" done in the German style and this made a deep impression on her and she began to desire to be a dancer. Her parents and aristocratic grandmother were opposed to her becoming a Ballet dancer as it was not considered respectable for a girl of noble origins. However she persisted and due to the fact that on her father's side she had a peasant grandfather she was given permission. Wulffius was firstly instructed by Marietta Balbo a famous former dancer with the Italian Ballet who taught private students in her studio in Latvia. She eventually convinced her family to allow her to enrol in the Maryinski Theatre (Imperial Ballet School) in St Petersburg when she was about 12 or 13. Unlike the other students she was able to travel back and forth from her home in Latvia to St Petersburg for extended periods of time.

Wulffius was taught by Maria Anderson in the lower classes and by Olga Preobrajenska in the higher classes. She recalls 

Wulffius remained at the Imperial Ballet School and the Petersburg University until 1922, when she fled Communist Russia for newly independent Latvia.

A Return to Latvia
In Riga she joined the Latvian Theatre where she danced under the name of Mirceva. She also taught at the Riga University. Her dancing name was based on her surname from her first marriage to Mario Marceva–Marcenos a Greek mountain engineer and a son of a Greek Ambassador. This first husband escaped Russia at the time of the Revolution via Vladivostok and sailed around Asia but died off the coast of Constantinople on the way to his parents home in Athens. Her second husband was a German Opera singer called Conrad Henzel.

Wulffius' parents, who are believed to have lived at Ruskulova Manor in the Salnevas area of Latgale, had left Latvia after its independence and returned to Russian territory in Vitebsk and lived hidden among the peasants until the rise of Stalin when they were killed by the Communists. Two of her brothers (Constantine and Nicolai) who had been Czarist officers were sent into battle in the front lines to be killed in a war against Finland. Wulffius also had another brother (Vladimir) and sister (Alexandra) who died when they were children.

Wulffius was friends with the writer Lev Urvancov (Leo Urvantzov) who loosely based his character Vera Mirceva on her and an incident in her life. She would visit Urvancov in Paris until his death in 1929. She strongly disagreed with him about his belief that Anna Anderson was the Grand Duchess Anastasia. Wulffius told her family that she had been a liberal socialist in her younger days as a student whose hope was for Russia to become a democratic constitutional monarchy. The murder of the Tsar and Royal Family which she claimed to have learnt about while travelling on a train shocked her and after this she became anti-communist. In the 1930s she spied on ex-pat communists on behalf of the Latvian government using the name of Vera Mirceva and posing as a Czech socialist. She spied on the communists in Spain during the civil war during her vacations. Wulffius was a follower of Rudolf Steiner and claimed to have visited him in Switzerland in the 1920s. She also recounted a story about a visit to the Karnak Temple in Egypt (probably in the 1930s) when she sailed with a certain Prince on his yacht to Egypt and down the Nile where she had to travel on a donkey as she could not ride the camel. She claimed to have met a group of women from a village who still claimed to preserve some of the ancient dances of Egypt. She later taught these to her ballet students in Australia and the performance was reported in the newspaper.

Her third husband was a Latvian-German Baron Alf-Paul Oscar Wulffius (Vulffius/ Vulfius) of Salnavas, Latvia. He was killed by the Communists during the Second World War (1941). At this time Wulffius was living in Daugavpils and according to her son Paul his father was living with a pianist who was his father's mistress. It seemed to be an amicable arrangement with Wulffius staying with them both when she was in Riga. This may be the Galina Vulfius (b.1912) mentioned as being taken by the communists with Alf-Paul in 1941.

Wulffius also at this time (1941) had a Ballet School in Daugavpils, Latvia. Bernard Levinson mentions her under the name of Madam Mirceva in his article titled "August in Latvia (For Maja Abramowitch)" at the time of the German invasion of Latvia. He uses quotes from the book of a Holocaust survivor Maja Abramovitch titled "To Forgive but not to Forget" (2002).   Wulffius under the name of N.Mircevas is also mentioned in Daugavpils in 1934, 1936 and 1937 in regards to the Ballet and she (as N. Mirceva) and her Ballet School performances is mentioned again in the same Journal in 1938 and 1939.

Wulffius fled to Germany with her son where she lived until she came to Australia in 1953. Her son Herman Paul Vulfiuss (1924–1998) had come to Australia in 1949  and married a 4th generation Western Australian Beth Lorraine Bartram (1931–2005) from Dumbleyung.

Life in Western Australia

In Western Australia in late 1953 Wulffius met Madame Kira Bousloff of the Western Australian Ballet and they became close friends. Madame Kira speaks of her lovingly in an interview with Michelle Potter in 1990. 

Wulffius founded her own Ballet School in Maddington Western Australia. She ran this school for seven years before handing it over to her close friend Madame Gundi Ferris. She also taught Russian at the University of Western Australia. She was an expert on the History of Dance. She continued until she was 80 to teach Perth's Ballet students the History of Dance and her own unique Ballet head, hand and arm movements (which she said were a cross between the Russian and Italian schools). Wulffius told her family and friends that a certain Estonian dancer had stolen her manuscript on hand movements and gestures and published it under her own name in Estonia. Joan Woods reports that the hand movements were based on those of Ella Ilbak a famous Estonia solo-dancer and writer who studied in St Petersburg at the same time as Wulffius. Joan Woods writing on the history of the West Australian Ballet says that Wulffius was one of Kira Bousloff's first helpers and was Ballet mistress of the company for 12 months. Joan Woods also writes:

 

Around 1979 she moved to live with her granddaughter Mrs Tamara Bartram (née Vulfiuss) at "Hillside" farm in Dumbleyung. She taught German to the students at the local school. Wulffius was fluent in six languages. She died on 6 February 1992 at Dumbleyung and is buried at the Nippering Cemetery near Dumbleyung.

References

1899 births
1992 deaths
Latvian emigrants to Australia
Australian ballerinas
Latvian emigrants to Germany
Latvian ballerinas
Ballet teachers
Dancers from Riga
Latvian World War II refugees